Buzcheh, also rendered as Buzjeh or Bujeh or Buju, may refer to:
 Buzcheh-ye Olya
 Buzcheh-ye Sofla
 Buzcheh-ye Vosta